Malcolm Darling (born 4 July 1947) is a Scottish former professional footballer. He was a winger who played for Blackburn Rovers, Norwich City, Rochdale, Bolton Wanderers, Chesterfield, Stockport County, Sheffield Wednesday, Hartlepool United and Bury.

Darling was a member of the Norwich City squad that won the second division championship in 1972.

References
Canary Citizens by Mark Davage, John Eastwood, Kevin Platt, published by Jarrold Publishing, (2001), 

1947 births
Scottish footballers
Blackburn Rovers F.C. players
Norwich City F.C. players
Bolton Wanderers F.C. players
Chesterfield F.C. players
Stockport County F.C. players
Sheffield Wednesday F.C. players
Hartlepool United F.C. players
Bury F.C. players
Living people
Scottish Junior Football Association players
Luncarty F.C. players
Association football midfielders